Pertti Ukkola (born 10 August 1950 in Sodankylä) is a Finnish wrestler and Olympic champion in Greco-Roman wrestling. He was selected Finnish Sportspersonality of the year 1977.

References

1950 births
Living people
People from Sodankylä
Olympic wrestlers of Finland
Wrestlers at the 1972 Summer Olympics
Wrestlers at the 1976 Summer Olympics
Wrestlers at the 1980 Summer Olympics
Finnish male sport wrestlers
Olympic gold medalists for Finland
Olympic medalists in wrestling
Medalists at the 1976 Summer Olympics
Sportspeople from Lapland (Finland)
20th-century Finnish people
21st-century Finnish people